is a Japanese dating sim game developed by Dingo Inc. and Enterbrain, and was released for the PlayStation Portable on February 2, 2012. Due to Enterbrain's involvement, Photo Kano is considered the spiritual successor to KimiKiss and Amagami despite having no recurring staff except for Ichirō Sugiyama who was the producer for KimiKiss. An enhanced version titled Photo Kano Kiss was released on April 25, 2013 for the PlayStation Vita. There have been five manga adaptations, and an anime television series produced by Madhouse began airing on April 5, 2013 on TBS.

Plot
Kazuya Maeda is a second-year high school student who takes pictures of girls with his camera that he received from his dad. The game focuses on his romantic encounters with various girls at his school. The anime adaptation goes across each girl, following a common arc until episode 4, which serves as the branching off point for each route; each route is an episode long (except for Haruka's, which received a two-part treatment), when one is completed, the next episode reverts to a certain point in time and goes down another route.

Characters

Main characters

Kazuya is the main protagonist of the story. He has tried and given up on many different kinds of activities including playing guitar and darts, among other things. His current hobby, sparked by the gift of his father's old digital camera, is photography.

Haruka is the protagonist's classmate. She is very popular among both boys and girls, has good grades and plays tennis very well. She can handle everything with ease but is not the type to show initiative herself. She is the protagonist's childhood friend; but, because he became conscious of her developing body, her beauty, as well as the gossip regarding the two of them once they reached middle school, he has distanced himself from her, much to her disappointment.

Hikari is a member of the photo club. She chooses not to take portrait shots, specializing instead in landscape/scenery and astronomy photos. She is not the type to engage in small talk and therefore is mostly seen by herself. She rarely smiles and is prone to sarcastic comments.

Aki is a third-year student with a rather stern personality, earning her the reputation as the "Captious Student Council President". Her grades are outstanding, the best Kouga Academy has ever seen, and was formerly a member of the swim club, specifically as a diver.

Nonoka has below average grades, is extremely athletic and has an upbeat personality that allows her to have a lot of friends of both genders. She is the ace pitcher of the softball club. Love is the last thing on her mind. She has been the protagonist's friend since middle school and has frequently given him nicknames based on his interests at the time; the one she uses most frequently is "Darts'un" from the time the protagonist tried playing darts.

Mai is a classmate of the protagonist's little sister, Kanon. Her personality is on the meek and shy side. She has average grades but is rather athletic. She engaged in gymnastics during middle school but switched to rhythmic gymnastics in high school.

Rina has a very gentle demeanor and is in the same school year as the protagonist. Her grades are quite good even with the careless mistakes that she often makes. She likes cooking and is the lone member of the Cooking Research Society.

Tomoe is a girl with a rather plain personality who easily blends into the background in the protagonist's class. Her grades are about average and she is not very athletic either. She always distances herself from her other classmates and would react timidly should anyone attempt to start a conversation with her. This shyness comes from having moved many times due to her father's work and not having been able to make fast friends as a result.

Supporting characters

Kanon is the protagonist's younger stepsister. She loves to sing and dance and dreams of becoming an idol. She often poses or reenacts scenes she has seen in shōjo manga or anime. She has average grades but is athletic. She joined the tennis club since she looks up to Haruka. She is rarely seen without a smile on her face. When they were children, she promised to be her stepbrother's true little sister, but secretly feels that Kazuya is her ideal man. In the game, she has her own route after completing the seven other girls' routes.

Hiromichi is the president of the Photography Club. He pursues a wide range of photos from the female students going about their daily lives to the borderline eroticism stuff. Possibly because of this that he is thoroughly hated by every girl in the school, but he seems not to mind.

He is the diminutive Photography Club member from class 2-A, and self-proclaimed specialist of low-angle shots, hence his nickname "Low-Angle Nakagawa".

Another member of the Photography Club, also from class 2-A. He is rather tall and therefore his specialty is the high-angle shot, and his nickname is "Boob-Glimpse Azuma".

The lone female member of the club, from class 1-C, her nickname is "Stealth", because of her specialty in photographing unsuspecting subjects. Due to the mole below her left eye as well as other clues, it is hinted that she is the popular cosplayer, Alice. Rina appears to be aware of this fact but keeps it quiet at Yuko's request. Yuko and Hikari are friends of hers, even though they belong to different clubs. She is an unlockable character.

Katsumi was the ace of the volleyball club until she injured her ankle during her freshman year, forcing her to retire. She is now the president of the Photo Club (not to be confused with the Photography Club), which takes all of the school's official photos. Katsumi created the Photo Club because she was rejected by Hiromichi for membership in the Photography Club (likely due to disagreeing with him on the issue of erotic photography). Since her injury, she has been learning about cameras, using them to record other students' dreams while cheering them on. Her interest in photography was sparked by a senpai with an interest in photography (who was also a friend of Kudō's) who cheered her up when she was disheartened after her injury. It is not specified if the boyfriend seen after her beach volleyball match partnered with Ruu is the same person. Katsumi is loved by all of the girls involved in club activities, especially those in the sports clubs.

Ruu is the up and coming star of the volleyball club. She joined Kōga Academy in order to play with Katsumi, the object of her admiration, but Katsumi was forced to retire due to injury. Disappointed but unable to erase her feelings for Katsumi, she also joined the Photo Club. She is an unlockable character in the game.

Misa is the protagonist's homeroom teacher. She teaches English. She considers teaching to be her calling in life and therefore she is very thorough in guiding her students. A harsh personality coupled with being somewhat untidy result in zero happenings in her love life. Momoko Ōtani is currently under her supervision.

She is a student teacher who came to Kouga Academy in the new term as a math teacher. With the exception of university, she has never been to a school with boys (having always attended all-girls' schools). Since she has a rather upbeat personality, her students often call her informally, which she does not object to and therefore naturally results in her high popularity among the student body. Like Yuko and Ruu, Momoko is an unlockable character.

Media

Video games
Photo Kano was developed by Dingo and Enterbrain and was distributed by Kadokawa Games. After the production team missed their initial released date on September 29, 2011 the game release was delayed until February 2, 2012 on the PlayStation Portable. It was later released as a download version on the PlayStation Network on February 29, 2012. An enhanced version titled Photo Kano Kiss for the PlayStation Vita was released on April 25, 2013, and features improved graphics and game mechanisms, alongside a new story arc.

Manga
A manga adaptation, illustrated by N' Yuzuki and titled Photo Kano: Sweet Snap, began serialization in the January 2012 issue of ASCII Media Works' Dengeki Maoh. The first tankōbon volume for Sweet Snap was released on July 27, 2012. The second adaptation, illustrated by Nylon and titled Photo Kano: Your Eyes Only, began serialization in the fifth issue of 2012 from Hakusensha's Young Animal magazine; its first volume was released on August 24, 2012. The third adaptation, illustrated by Taichi Amasora and titled Photo Kano: Memorial Pictures, began serialization the April 2012 issue of Earth Star Entertainment's Comic Earth Star magazine; its first volume was released on October 12, 2012. The fourth adaptation, illustrated by Kaisanbutsu and titled Photo Kano: Happy Album, began serialization in volume two of Enterbrain's Gianism magazine, sold on March 30, 2012. The first volume of Happy Album was released on March 25, 2013. The fifth adaptation, illustrated by Takao Hino and titled Photo Kano: Love Album, began serialization in Enterbrain's Famitsu Comic Clear on June 22, 2012. The first volume of Love Album was released on March 25, 2013.

Books and publications
Enterbrain published two volumes of a light novel series titled Photo Kano: Pentaprism Memories, written by Fumihiko Shimo and illustrated by Natsume Shimano, between March and June 2012. Enterbrain published the guide book Photo Kano Official Complete Guide on March 5, 2012. Enterbrain also published two fan books: Photo Kano Love & Happy Book on January 19, 2012 and Photo Kano Visual Works on August 31, 2012.

Anime
A 13-episode anime television series adaptation, produced by Madhouse and written and directed by Akitoshi Yokoyama, began airing on April 5, 2013. Mae Shimada is responsible for the character designs. The anime has been licensed by Sentai Filmworks for digital and home video release in 2014.

Episode list

Reception

Photo Kano Kiss on the PlayStation Vita sold 30,172 physical retail copies during the first week of release in Japan. By mid-May 2013, the number of retail sales rose to 46,167 copies. As of December 2015, both games have sold a combined total of 200,000 copies across the PSP and Vita platforms.

References

External links
Photo Kano video game official website 
Photo Kano Kiss official website 
Anime official website 

2012 video games
2013 video games
2013 anime television series debuts
Anime television series based on video games
ASCII Media Works manga
Kadokawa Dwango franchises
Dating sims
Earth Star Entertainment manga
Enterbrain manga
Hakusensha manga
High school-themed video games
Japan-exclusive video games
Kadokawa Shoten games
PlayStation Portable games
PlayStation Vita games
Madhouse (company)
Seinen manga
Sentai Filmworks
TBS Television (Japan) original programming
Video games developed in Japan